The 2017 Garden Open was a professional tennis tournament played on clay courts. It was the ninth edition of the tournament which was part of the 2017 ATP Challenger Tour. It took place in Rome, Italy between 8 and 13 May 2017.

Singles main-draw entrants

Seeds

 1 Rankings as of May 1, 2017.

Other entrants
The following players received wildcards into the singles main draw:
  Riccardo Bellotti
  Matteo Donati
  Gianluigi Quinzi
  Stefanos Tsitsipas

The following player received entry into the singles main draw as an alternate:
  Agustín Velotti

The following player received entry into the singles main draw as a special exempt:
  Stefano Travaglia

The following players received entry from the qualifying draw:
  Yannick Maden
  Oscar Otte
  Maciej Rajski
  Wu Di

Champions

Singles

  Marco Cecchinato def.  Jozef Kovalík 6–4, 6–4.

Doubles

  Andreas Mies /  Oscar Otte def.  Kimmer Coppejans /  Márton Fucsovics 4–6, 7–6(14–12), [10–8].

References 

Garden Open
Garden Open
Garden